This is a glossary of acronyms and initials used for aircraft weapons in the Russian Federation and formerly the USSR. The Latin-alphabet names are phonetic representations of the Cyrillic originals, and variations are inevitable.

Aircraft guns

 30 mm cannon

 7.62 mm four-barrelled machine-gun

 30 mm twin-barrelled cannon a.k.a. AO-17 and GSh-30/II

 12.7 mm four-barrelled machine-gun

 30 mm cannon a.k.a. GSh-30-1 and TKB-687

 N.M. Afansa'yev & N.F. Makarov

 Aviatsionnaya Pushka Kurchevsky – aircraft cannon Kurchevsky

 Berezin. A 12.7mm caliber machine gun used in 

 Berezin NT.

 [poolemyot] Berezina Sinkhronnyy - Berezin's synchronised machine-gun

 [poolemyot] Degtyaryova Aviatsionnyy - Degtyaryov machine-gun for aircraft

 DinámoReaktívnaya Púshka - динамореактивная пушка, ДPП - recoilless rifle/cannon

 Gondola Pushechnaya – cannon pod

 Gryazev & Shipoonov

1. Kompleks [Vo'orouzheniya] – weapons system
2. (suffix) Kroopnokalibernyy – large calibre
3. (suffix) Kryl'yevoy – wing mounted

 (suffix) Lafetnaya – for permanent mounting

 (suffix) Motornaya – engine mounted

 Motornaya Pushka – engine mounted cannon

 Motornaya Pushka Shpital'novo – Shpital'nyy engine mounted cannon

 Mozharovsky-Venevidov turret gun Georgy Mozharovsky & Ivan Venevidov

 A.E. Nudelman

 Aircraft cannon designed by A.E. Nudelman & A.A. Rikhter

 Aircraft cannon designed by A.E. Nudelman & Suranov.

Pushka Taubin-Baburin - cannon Taubin-Baburin (both Taubin & Baburin were executed for their guns {MP-3 / MP-6 / PTB-6 / PTB-23 / Taubin 23} failure, apparently)

 Poolemyot Vozdooshnyy – machine-gun for aircraft 7.62mm machine gun based on Maxim machine gun by A. Nadashkevich & Feodor Tokarev

 (suffix) Sinkronayah - synchronised

 Boris Shpital'nyy

Shpital'nyy FK

 [poolemyot] Shpitahl'novi i Komarnitskovi Aviatsionny, Skorostrel'nyy - Shpital'nyy/Komarnitskii rapid firing machine gun

 Shpital'nyy/Vladimirov Aviatsionny Krupnokalibernaya - Shpital'nyy/Komarnitskii large calibre aircraft cannon

 Samoletnaya Podvesnaya Pushechnaya Ustanovka – aircraft gun pod

 Tool'skoye Konstrooktorskoye Byuro – Tula design bureau see AM-23

 Ooniversal'nyy [poolemyot] Berezina K - M. Berezin 12.7mm machine-gun

 Ooniversalny Berezina [poolemyot] Sinkhronnyy- M. Berezin synchronised 12.7mm machine-gun

 Ooniversalny Berezina [poolemyot] Turel'ny - M. Berezin turret 12.7mm machine-gun

 : Ultra [poolemyot] Shpitahl'novi i Komarnitskovi Aviatsionny, Skorostrel'nyy – Ultra Shpital'nyy/Komarnitskii rapid firing machine gun- 7.62mm machine-gun

 Unifitcirovanny Pushechny Konteiner – universal gun pod

 Volkov-Yartcev

Bombs, turrets, etc

 torpedo

 Aviatsionnykh Granaht - aviation grenades

 Aghitatsionnaya AviaBomba - psychological warfare/propaganda in the form of 'leaflet bombs'

 - chemical bomblet for cluster bomb

 - anti shipping mine

 - anti shipping mine

 Aviatsionny Raketny Snaryad – aircraft unguided rocket

 Aviatsionny Reaktivnii Snaryad – high velocity aircraft rocket

 Aktivnaya Rahdiolokatsionnaya Golvka Samonavedeniya – active radar seeker head

 - chaff and flare dispenser

 Aviatsionnaya Torpeda - anti submarine torpedoes

 (suffix) -  torpedo

 - retarded/rocket assisted runway cratering bomb

 Blisternaya Oostanovka Berezina – Berezin's blister mount

 Broneboynaya AviaBomba – armour-piercing bomb

 Derzhatel' Aviatsionnykh Granaht – container aviation grenade

 Dymovaya AviaBomba - smoke bomb

 Distantsionno [oopravlyayemaya] Bahshnya – remote-controlled turret

 - turret

 Dnev-naya Orienteerno-Signahl'naya AviaBomba - day marker/signal flare bombs

 - smoke bomb

 Fugahsnaya AviaBomba - high explosive bomb

 Fotograficheskaya AviaBomba – photo flash bomb

 Foogahsno-Zazhigahtel'naya Aviabomba - high explosive/incendiary bomb

 - chemical weapon

 Imitatsionnaya Aviabomba - high explosive/incendiary bomb

 - anti shipping mine

1. (suffix) Kassetnaya bomba – cluster bomb
2. Kompleks [Vo'orouzheniya] – weapons system
3. Kormovaya [strekovaya oostanovka] – tail barbette Il-28 a.k.a. Il-K-6

1. Korrekteeruyemaya AviaBomba – guided depth charge
2. Korrekteeruyemaya AviaBomba - guided bomb

 - cassette bomb dispenser

 Kormovaya Distantsionno [Oopravlyayemaya] Bahshnya – dorsal remote-controlled turret

 - turret

 - air-to-surface missile

 - chemical weapon phosgene also ChAB

 KonteinerMalykhGruzov Universalny – small weapons carrier pod CBLS

 Kormovaya Oostanovka – rear [defensive armament] installation a.k.a. Il-KU3 Il-22

 KorrekteeRuyemaya AviaBomba - guided bomb 1948 IR guided bomb

 - anti-shipping missile

 (suffix) Lazernoe navedeniye – Laser guidance

 Lyookovaya Oostanovka – hatch [defensive armament] installation

 (suffix) [torpeda] Modernizeerovannaya Aviatsionnaya Nizhkovysotnaya – modernised aircraft torpedo for low-altitude attacks

 - turret for Il-2 – Mozharovskiy and Venevidov

 - nuclear weapon

 Nizhnyaya verkhnyaya Distantsionno oopravlyaaemaya Bahshnya – ventral remote controlled turret

 Nochnaya Orieynteerno-Signahl'naya AviaBomba - night marker/signal flare bombs

 - non-persistent agent dispenser

 (suffix) Nizkoye Torpedometahniye – low altitude torpedo attack

 - cannon mount for Il-102

 (suffix) Omno-Detoneeruyushchaya – volume detonation bomb [fuel/air bomb]

 Omno-Detoneeruyushchaya AviaBomba – volume detonation bomb [fuel/air bomb]

 Oskolochno Fugasnaya AviaBomba – fragmentation high explosive bomb

 Oskolochno Fugasnaya-Zazhigahtel'naya AviaBomba – fragmentation/high explosive/incendiary bomb

 Oryenteerno-Markernaya AviaBomba – maritime marker bombs

 Odinochnoye Reaktivnoye Oroodiye – single rocket gun ORO-82 - tube launcher for TRS-82

 Prakticheskaya [aviabomba] - practice bomb

 Protivolodochaya AviaBomba - depth charge/anti-submarine bombs

1. - parachute flare
2. Protivosamolyotnaya AviaBomba - anti-aircraft bomb

 Pritsel'naya Stahntsiya – sighting station

 Protivitahnkovaya AviaBomba - armour piercing bomblets

 - hollow-charge bomblet for cluster bomb

 - synchroniser

1. Raketa – air-to-air missile [rocket]
2. (suffix) Rahdiolokatsionnaya [Golovka Samonavedniya] – radar seeker head

 Raketnaya Aviatsionnaya Torpeda - rocket propelled torpedo

 Razovaya Bombovaya Kasseta - cluster bomb dispenser

 - nuclear weapon

 Rahdio-Ghidroakoosticheskiy Booy - sonobuoy

 Rahdio-Ghidroakoosticheskiy Booy N - sonobuoy

 - fragmentation bomblet for cluster bomb

 - incendiary bomblet for cluster bomb

1. Reaktivny Snaryad - rocket projectiles
2. - Radar homing

 Snaryad - rocket

 Svetyashchaya AviaBomba – flare bomb

 Sharikovaya Oskolochnaya AviaBomba - pellet bomb/bomblet

 - persistent agent dispenser

 Sistema Pushechnovo Vo'oroozheniya – defensive armament system

 (suffix) Teplovaya [golovka samonavedeniya] – Infra-Red seeker head

 Tsvetnaya Orieynteerno-Signahl'naya AviaBomba - coloured marker/signal flare bombs

 -  torpedo

 -  torpedo

 (suffix) Televizionno-Komahndnoye navedeniye – TV guidance

 - nuclear weapon

 - chemical weapon

 -  torpedo

 (suffix) Televizionno-Korreyatsionnoye Samonavedeniye – TV correlated guidance

 ToorboReaktivnyy Snaryad – [turbo-jet projectile] rocket projectiles

 Tsvetnaya oriyenteerno-Signahl'naya AviaBomba – coloured marker/signal flare bombs

 - dorsal powered turret

1.Oonifitseerovannyy Blok – universal [standardised] pod
2. - rocket pod
3. Oopravlyayermaya Bomba – guided bomb

 - experimental defensive installation- Il-2

 - chemical warfare liquid dispensers

 - turret for Il-4 I. ShebanovVylivnoy Aviatsionny Pribor - chemical weapon dispenser

 Verkhnyaya Distantsionno [Oopravlyayemaya] Bahshnya – dorsal remote-controlled turret

 (suffix) Vysotnoye Torpedometahniye – high altitude torpedo attack

 Verkhnyaya [Strelkovaya] Oostanovka – dorsal turret Il-10/Il-20

 Verkhnyaya [Strelkovaya] Oostanovka Bombardirovshchika – remote controlled dorsal turret for bombers

 Zazhigahtel'naya Aviabomba - incendiary bomb

 Zazhigahtel'naya AP - incendiary bomb dispenser

 Zazhigahtel'nyy Bahk - incendiary [napalm] tanks

See also
 Glossary of Russian and USSR aviation acronyms: Aircraft designations
 Glossary of Russian and USSR aviation acronyms: Avionics and instruments
 Glossary of Russian and USSR aviation acronyms: Engines and equipment
 Glossary of Russian and USSR aviation acronyms: Miscellaneous
 Glossary of Russian and USSR aviation acronyms: Organisations
 Glossary of Russian and USSR aviation acronyms: Weapons and armament

References

Sources
Gordon, Yefim. Early Soviet Jet Bombers. Hinkley, Midland. 2004. 
Gordon, Yefim. Early Soviet Jet Fighters. Hinkley, Midland. 2002. 
Gordon, Yefim. Sukhoi Interceptors. Hinkley, Midland. 2004. 
Gordon, Yefim. Soviet Rocket Fighters. Hinkley, Midland. 2006.  / 
Gordon, Yefim. Soviet Heavy Interceptors. Hinkley, Midland. 2004. 
Gordon, Yefim. Lavochkin's Last Jets. Hinkley, Midland. 2004.  / 
Gordon, Yefim & Komissarov, Dmitry & Komissarov, Sergey. OKB Ilyushin. Hinkley, Midland. 2004. 
Gunston, Bill. The Osprey Encyclopaedia of Russian Aircraft 1875–1995. London, Osprey. 1995. 
Antonov, Vladimir & Gordon, Yefim & others. OKB Sukhoi. Leicester. Midland. 1996. 
Gordon, Yefim. Komissarov, Dmitry & Sergey. OKB Yakovlev. Hinkley. Midland. 2005. 
Gordon, Yefim & Komissarov, Dmitry. OKB Mikoyan. Hinkley, Midland. 2009. 
Gordon, Yefim. Komissarov, Dmitry & Sergey. OKB Ilyushin. Hinkley. Midland. 2004. 
Gordon, Yefim & Rigmant, Vladimir. Tupolev Tu-144. Midland. Hinkley. 2005.  
Gordon, Yefim & Komissarov, Dmitry. Antonov An-12. Midland. Hinkley. 2007.  
Gordon, Yefim & Komissarov, Dmitry & Komissarov, Sergey. Mil's Heavylift Helicopters. Hinkley, Midland. 2005. 
Gordon, Yefim. Tupolev Tu-160 "Blackjack". Hinkley, Midland. 2003. 
Gordon, Yefim & Komissarov, Dmitry. Antonov's Jet Twins. Hinkley, Midland. 2005. 
Gordon, Yefim & Komissarov, Dmitry. Kamov Ka-27/-32 Family. Hinkley, Midland. 2006.  
Gordon, Yefim & Komissarov, Dmitry. Antonov An-2. Midland. Hinkley. 2004. 
Gordon, Yefim & Rigmant, Vladimir. Tupolev Tu-114. Midland. Hinkley. 2007.  
Gordon, Yefim & Komissarov, Dmitry. Ilyushin Il-12 and Il-14. Midland. Hinkley. 2005.  
Gordon, Yefim. Yakovlev Yak-36, Yak-38 & Yak-41. Midland. Hinkley. 2008. 
Gordon, Yefim. Komissarov, Dmitry & Sergey. Antonov's Turboprop Twins. Hinkley. Midland. 2003. 
Gordon, Yefim. Myasischev M-4 and 3M. Hinkley. Midland. 2003. 
Gordon, Yefim & Rigmant, Vladimir. Tupolev Tu-104. Midland. Hinkley. 2007. 
Gordon, Yefim. Komissarov, Dmitry. Mil Mi-8/Mi-17. Hinkley. Midland. 2003. 
Gordon, Yefim & Dexter, Kieth Polikarpov's I-16 Fighter. Hinkley. Midland. 2001. 
Gordon, Yefim. Mikoyan MiG-25 "Foxbat". Hinkley. Midland. 2007.  
Gordon, Yefim & Dexter, Kieth Mikoyan's Piston-Engined Fighters. Hinkley. Midland. 2003. 
Gordon, Yefim & Rigmant, Vladimir. Tupolev Tu-4. Midland. Hinkley. 2002. 
Gordon, Yefim. Sukhoi S-37 and Mikoyan MFI. Midland. Hinkley. 2001 reprinted 2006.  
Gordon, Yefim. Khazanov, Dmitry. Yakovlev's Piston-Engined Fighters. Hinkley. Midland. 2002. 
Gordon, Yefim. Sal'nikov, Andrey. Zablotsky, Aleksandr. Beriev's Jet Flying Boats. Hinkley. Midland. 2006.  
Gordon, Yefim. & Dexter, Keith. Polikarpov's Biplane Fighters. Hinkley. Midland Publishing. 2002. 
Gordon, Yefim. Soviet/Russian Aircraft Weapons. Midland. 2004. 

WW1
Glossaries of Russian and USSR aviation
Aircraft weapons
Military terminology
Military of the Soviet Union
Military of Russia
Wikipedia glossaries using description lists